Route 184 is a state highway in southeastern Connecticut, running from Groton to North Stonington.

Route description
Route 184 begins as a freeway from northbound exit 86 of I-95 just north of the city of Groton. It crosses over Route 12  later at an interchange and soon becomes a surface street after another quarter of a mile. The road continues east northeast towards the village of Center Groton, where it meets Route 117. It continues another  via Burnetts Corner to the head of the Mystic River in the village of Old Mystic near the Stonington town line. Route 184 travels four miles (6 km) through the northern part of Stonington before entering the town of North Stonington. It has a junction with Route 2 at a rotary south of North Stonington center. Beyond Route 2, the surroundings become rural as Route 184 heads towards the Rhode Island state line. Route 184 ends just short of the state line at Route 216 near exit 93 of I-95. The roadway continues past Route 216 to the state line as State Road 626, which originally connected with Rhode Island Route 3 prior to the construction of I-95 in the area.

Route 184 is also known as Gold Star Highway, New London Turnpike, and Providence-New London Turnpike along its lengths in Groton, Stonington, and North Stonington respectively.

History
In 1818, a turnpike was chartered to provide an improved road from the Thames River ferry (between New London and Groton, Connecticut) to the Hopkinton and Richmond Turnpike in Rhode Island, known as the Groton and Stonington Turnpike. The toll road ran more or less along the modern alignment of Route 184. The establishment of this road completed a continuous turnpike route from Providence, Rhode Island to New London. The turnpike corporation was dissolved in 1853, one year after opening continuous rail service from New York City to Boston via Providence.

The route from the borough of Groton to the town center of North Stonington was designated as State Highway 331 in 1922. Highway 331 used modern Route 184 to the junction with Route 201, then Route 201 until the intersection with Route 2. In 1932, Route 84 was established from part of old Highway 331 along the current routes of Route 184 to Old Mystic, then modern Route 234 to US 1 in Pawcatuck. In 1935, Route 84 was relocated to the current route along the old Groton and Stoninton Turnpike alignment to the Rhode Island state line. In 1958, Route 84 was renumbered to Route 95 to serve as a temporary link for motorists following I-95, which had not yet been completed in Southeastern Connecticut.  In December 1964, Route 95 was renumbered as I-95 opened in the Groton area.  The eastern terminus was also truncated from the state line to its current location.

Junction list
As part of an I-95 signing contract, the CT 12 interchange received a mile-based number.

References

External links

184
Transportation in New London County, Connecticut